The National Population and Family Planning Board is a non-ministry government body for family planning. It was established 29 June 1970.

History
Family planning in Indonesia was started with founding of Planned Parenthood Federation on 23 December 1957 and became Indonesia Planned Parenthood Federation and recognized by Department of Justice as legal person in 1967. On 17 October 1968, the Department of People's Welfare established National Family Planning Board (. In 1970, National Family Planning Board transformed into National Family Planning Coordinating Board ( which had great challenge into family planning.

In 1999, family planning was mandated to be decentralised. Some family planning responsibility was shared to provincial, city, and regency responsibilities. The decentralization started in 2004.

In 2009, National Family Planning Coordinating Board was transformed into National Population and Family Planning Board. The transformation reflected in mission of creating a visionary development of the population and creating a prosperous small family. The responsibility was expanded from family planning only with population control.

Head of NPFPB
 Suwardjono Surjaningrat (1970–1983)
 Haryono Suyono (1983–1998)
 Ida Bagus Oka (1998–1999)
 Khofifah Indar Parawansa (1999–2001)
 Yaumil Agoes Achir (2001–2003)
 Sumarjati Arjoso (2003–2006)
 Sugiri Syarief (2006–2013)
 Fasli Jalal (2013–2015)
 Surya Chandra Surapaty (2015–2017)
 Sigit Priohutomo (2017–2019)
 Hasto Wardoyo (2019–incumbent)

Responsibility
The National Population and Family Planning Board is responsible for:
 population control
 family planning

Organisation
The National Population and Family Planning Board consists of:
 Head
 Main Secretariat
 Bureau of Planning 
 Bureau of Human Resource
 Bureau of Finance and State Resource Management
 Bureau of Law, Organization, and Management
 Bureau of General Affairs and Public Relation
 Deputy of Population Control 
 Directorate of Population Control Policy Integration
 Directorate of Population Control Planning
 Directorate of Population Education Cooperation
 Directorate of Population Impact Analysis
 Deputy of Family Planning and Reproductive Health
 Directorate of Family Planning Service Access Development
 Directorate of Family Planning Service Quality Development
 Directorate of Reproductive Health
 Directorate of Special Area Family Planning Service
 Deputy of Prosperous Family and Family Empowerment
 Directorate of Infant and Child Family Development
 Directorate of Adolescence Resilience
 Directorate of Geriatric and Vulnerable Families Resilience
 Directorate of Economics Family Empowerment
 Deputy of Advocation, Movement, and Information
 Directorate of Information Technology and Data
 Directorate of Advocation and Organisational Relation
 Directorate of Communication, Information, and Education
 Directorate of Report and Statistics
 Directorate of Field Line Development and Movement
 Deputy of Training, Research, and Development
 Centre of Population and Family Planning Education and Training
 Centre of Population and Family Planning Training and International Cooperation
 Centre of Population Research and Development
 Centre of Family Planning and Prosperous Family Development Research and Development
 Main Inspectorate

References

External links
Official website
BKKBN Official YouTube channel

Government agencies of Indonesia
Government agencies established in 1970